(from Latin: "In the first") was an encyclical of Pope Pius XI. Promulgated on December 11, 1925, it introduced the Feast of Christ the King.

Purpose and content

Quas primas followed Pius's initial encyclical, Ubi arcano Dei consilio, which he referred to in his opening statement: ...manifold evils in the world were due to the fact that the majority of men had thrust Jesus Christ and his holy law out of their lives; that these had no place either in private affairs or in politics: and we said further, that as long as individuals and states refused to submit to the rule of our Savior, there would be no really hopeful prospect of a lasting peace among nations.

In Ubi arcano, Pius enjoined the faithful to seek "the Peace of Christ in the Kingdom of Christ".

Quas primas established the Feast of Christ the King, which was Pope Pius XI's response to the world's increasing secularization and nationalism. 

It was written in the aftermath of World War I and the Revolutions of 1917–1923, which saw the fall of the Hohenzollerns, Romanovs, Habsburgs and Ottomans. In contrast, Pope Pius XI pointed to a king "of whose kingdom there shall be no end".  In 1925 the Pope asked the French Dominican priest Édouard Hugon, professor of philosophy and theology at the Pontifical University of Saint Thomas Aquinas, Angelicum, to work on Quas primas.

"the Word of God, as consubstantial with the Father, has all things in common with him, and therefore has necessarily supreme and absolute dominion over all things created". In Matthew 28:18 Jesus himself says, "All power in heaven and on earth has been given to me." In Revelation 19:16 Christ is recognized as "King of kings and Lord of lords."

The encyclical summarised both the Old Testament and the New Testament teaching on the kingship of Christ. Invoking an earlier encyclical Annum sacrum of Pope Leo XIII, Pius XI suggested that the Kingdom of Christ embraces the whole mankind. Pius explained that by virtue of Christ’s claim to kingship as creator and redeemer, societies as well as individuals owe him
obligations as king.

Significance for laity

While the encyclical was addressed to Catholic bishops, Pope Pius XI wanted the feast of Christ the King to encourage the laity:

Notes

External links
Quas primas (English translation)

Catholic liturgy
Encyclicals of Pope Pius XI
Christ the King

1925 documents
1925 in Christianity
December 1925 events